A wildebeest is a type of African antelope.

Wildebeest may also refer to:
Wildebeest (character), several characters in DC Comics
The Vickers Vildebeest, a 20th-century torpedo bomber
Baby Wildebeest, a fictional character in DC Comics' New Titans series
Wildebeest (ride), a  water slide at Holiday World & Splashin' Safari in Santa Claus, Indiana
Wildebeest chess, a chess variant by R. Wayne Schmittberger

See also
Gnu (disambiguation)